Ferrotramviaria is a private railway company of Italy. Based in Bari, in the Apulia region, it manages the Ferrovie del Nord Barese network, composed by the Bari–Barletta railway and the Bari metropolitan railway service.

Railway services 

Ferrotramviaria operates two railway lines on the network of Ferrovie del Nord Barese:
 Bari–Barletta railway, opened in 1965, former known as Ferrovia Bari Nord;
 Bari metropolitan railway service, opened in 2008, also known as Metropolitana San Paolo.

On the network are two commuter lines (FM 1 and FM 2) and two regional lines (FR 1 and FR 2) in service.

The company also has two locomotives used on freight services along the Adriatic coast.

Rolling stock

References

External links 

 

Railway companies of Italy
Companies based in Apulia